Gura Căinarului is a commune in Floreşti District, Moldova.

Etymology

Economy

References

Communes of Florești District